Capolago Lago is an infrequently served railway station on the Monte Generoso railway, a rack railway that connects Capolago with the summit of Monte Generoso in the Swiss canton of Ticino. The station is the lower terminus of the line, and provides interchange with ships of the Società Navigazione del Lago di Lugano at an immediately adjacent jetty on Lake Lugano.

The station is only served to coincide with the arrival of a ship from Lugano; most trains start some  further up the line at Capolago-Riva San Vitale station. It is served by the following trains:

References

External links 
 

Railway stations in Ticino